James Willie may refer to:

James Willie (Texas politician) (1823–1863), Texas Attorney General
 James G. Willie (1815–1895), Latter-day Saint handcart pioneer
James Willie (Malaysian politician), one of the Members of the Dewan Negara, 5th Malaysian Parliament
James Willie, character in 17 Miracles